Walshville Township (T7N R5W) is located in Montgomery County, Illinois, United States. As of the 2010 census, its population was 347 and it contained 162 housing units.

Geography

Walshville Twp:

Demographics

Adjacent townships
 South Litchfield Township (north)
 Hillsboro Township (northeast)
 Grisham Township (east)
 Shoal Creek Township, Bond County (southeast)
 New Douglas Township, Madison County (south)
 Staunton Township, Macoupin County (west)
 Mount Olive Township, Macoupin County (west)
 Cahokia Township, Macoupin County (northwest)

References

External links
City-data.com
Illinois State Archives
Historical Society of Montgomery County

Townships in Montgomery County, Illinois
Townships in Illinois